"Mmmh" is a song recorded by South Korean singer Kai. It was released on November 30, 2020, as the lead single of his debut extended play, Kai. The song was written and composed by Keelah Jacobsen, Cameron Jai, JUNNY and Jane. Musically, "Mmmh" was described as a R&B song with a simple yet addictive melody on a minimalist track.

Upon release, "Mmmh" received generally positive reviews from music critics. Commercially, the song debuted at number 26 on the Gaon Digital Chart and charted at number 15 on the US World Digital Song Sales chart. An accompanying dystopian sci-fi themed music video for the song was released in conjunction with the release of the song. Kai promoted the song with televised live performances on various South Korean music programs including Music Bank, Show! Music Core and Inkigayo.

Background and release 
On November 30, Kai made his official debut as a solo artist with the extended play Kai, which went onto debut at number three on South Korea's Gaon Album Chart. "Mmmh" was released on November 30 for digital download and streaming in various countries by SM Entertainment, as the lead single of Kai.

Composition 
"Mmmh" was described as a R&B pop song with a simple yet addictive melody on a minimalist track. In terms of musical notation, the song is composed in the key of G# minor, with a tempo of 137 beats per minute and is three minutes and twelve seconds long. It is also described to be a charming, straight-forward love song. The lyrics confidently portray the attraction one feels to someone one has met for the first time.

Music video and promotion 
An accompanying music video for "Mmmh" was uploaded to SM Entertainment's official YouTube channel, six hours ahead with the single's release. It was preceded by a teaser released on the same platform on November 26. The video features the singer's looking upon the city from the edge of a rooftop with striking looks featuring an ombré mullet and colorful garments as he dances to the sensual track. The visuals end with the singer standing on top of a building with a neon-lit city serving as the background. 

Before the official release, Kai held an online press conference with Baekhyun as his MC, where he talked about the song for the first time for the media. An hour before the release, he held a live broadcast through Naver's V Live app, where he talked about the album, songs and production process. Kai performed "Mmmh" for the first time on Naver Now Party B.

Commercial performance 
"Mmmh" debuted at number 26 on the Gaon Digital Chart issue dated November 29 to December 5, 2020. The song also debuted at number one on the component Download Chart. Additionally, the song charted at number 23 on the US Billboard World Digital Song Sales chart.

Credits 
Credits adapted from EP's liner notes.

Studio 
 SM Yellow Tail Studio – recording, engineered for mix, digital editing
 SM Blue Cup Studio – mixing
 821 Sound Mastering – mastering

Personnel 
 SM Entertainment – executive producer
 Lee Soo-man – producer
 Lee Sung-soo – production director, executive supervisor
 Tak Young-jun – executive supervisor
 Yoo Young-jin – music and sound supervisor
 Kai – vocals
 Jane – lyrics, composition
 JUNNY – lyrics, composition, background vocals
 Keelah Jacobsen – composition, arrangement 
 Cameron Jai – composition, background vocals 
 Harold "Alawn" Philippon – arrangement 
 Deez – vocal directing
 Noh Min-ji – recording, engineered for mix, digital editing
 Jung Eui-seok – mixing
 Kwon Nam-woo – mastering

Charts

Weekly

Monthly

Release history

References 

2020 songs
2020 singles
Korean-language songs
SM Entertainment singles